Baseball at the 1983 Pan American Games was contested between teams representing Brazil, Canada, Colombia, Cuba, Dominican Republic, Netherlands Antilles, Nicaragua, Panama, Puerto Rico, United States, and Venezuela. The 1983 edition was the ninth Pan American Games, and was hosted by Caracas.

Cuba entered the competition as the three-time defending champions, having won the gold medal in 1971, 1975, and 1979. They successfully defended their title, with Nicaragua finishing second.

Medal summary

Medal table

Medalists

References

 

Events at the 1983 Pan American Games
1983
Pan American Games
1983 Pan American Games